Chantonnay is a commune in the Vendée department in the Pays de la Loire region in western France.

Geography
The river Lay flows southwestward through the commune and forms part of its eastern and southern borders.

Climate

Chantonnay has a oceanic climate (Köppen climate classification Cfb).

Population

See also
Communes of the Vendée department

References

Communes of Vendée